Seven Churches may refer to:

Seven Churches of Asia, mentioned in the Book of Revelation
Seven Churches of Saint Thomas, a tradition in Indian Christians

In music it may refer to:
Seven Churches (album), an album by Possessed